Linda's Tavern is a bar and restaurant in the Capitol Hill neighborhood of Seattle, Washington, United States.

Description and history 
Opened in February 1994, Linda's is the last place Nirvana frontman Kurt Cobain was spotted before his death. The tavern has been referred to as the "grunge Cheers".

Reception
Linda's has featured on several Thrillist lists, including "Seattle's 26 best Boozy Brunches" (2014), "The 21 best dive bars in America 2014", "14 Seattle Bars That Are Open on Christmas Day" (2015), "The Best Dive Bars in Seattle" (2016), and "The Best Bars in Seattle Right Now" (2017).

References

External links

 

1994 establishments in Washington (state)
Capitol Hill, Seattle
Restaurants established in 1994
Restaurants in Seattle
Dive bars in Washington (state)